Justin Springer (born 8 July 1993) is a former professional footballer and current coach, who serves as head coach of League1 Ontario club Guelph United FC. Born in Canada, he represented the Saint Kitts and Nevis national team.

University career
Springer began attending the University of Guelph in 2012, where he played for the men's soccer team. In his first season, he played all sixteen games and was named an OUA West First Team All-Star. In his second season, he was once again named an OUA First Team All-Star and was invited to play in the OUA Showcase in the spring. He was once again named an OUA West First Team All-Star in both his third and fourth seasons. In his fifth and final season, he captained the team and helped the team with the OUA championship and earn a third-place finish in the 2016 CIS Championship. He was named an OUA First Team All-Star for the fifth consecutive year, while also being named a U Sports Second Team All-Canadian.

Club career
Springer began playing for USL PDL club K–W United FC in 2015. In 2016, he made 13 appearances, scoring one goal and appearing in one playoff match. In 2017, Springer made another 11 appearances for K–W, scoring one goal and making one playoff appearance.

He then spent a couple months on trial with Toronto FC II.

In 2018, Springer joined League1 Ontario club Vaughan Azzurri, making nine appearances in the regular season and appearing in Vaughan's first two playoff matches of the group stage. He then played in the final against Woodbridge Strikers, winning the league championship.

On 8 February 2019, Springer signed his first professional contract with Canadian Premier League side York9. He made his debut for York9 in their inaugural match against Forge FC on April 27, 2019. He played in 11 league matches in 2019.

While serving as the Guelph United FC associate coach, he appeared in two matches, playing the full 90 minutes each time.

International career
Springer was born in Canada to a Kittitian father.

He represented Canada at the 2015 FISU Universiade.

He made his debut for the Saint Kitts and Nevis national football team in a friendly 0–0 tie with Nicaragua on 31 August 2016. In September 2019, he declined a national team call-up to pursue minute with his club team, but returned to the squad the for the next set of call-ups in October and November.

Coaching career
He has served as the assistant coach of the University of Guelph Gryphons soccer team since 2018 and also serves as the Technical Manager of the youth Guelph Soccer Club. In 2021, he was named as co-head coach of Guelph United F.C. in League1 Ontario, alongside Keith Mason. In 2021, after Guelph United won the league title, he was named co-coach of the year with fellow Guelph Associate coach Keith Mason. In 2023, he became the full-time head coach, with Mason becoming the General Manager.

Career statistics

Honours
K–W United
USL PDL Championship: 2015

Vaughan Azzurri
League1 Ontario Championship: 2018

Guelph United
League1 Ontario Championship: 2021

Individual
OUA First Team All-Star: 2012, 2013, 2014, 2015, 2016
U Sports Second Team All-Canadian: 2015

References

External links
 Guelph Gryphons profile
 
 

1993 births
Living people
Citizens of Saint Kitts and Nevis through descent
Saint Kitts and Nevis footballers
Association football defenders
Saint Kitts and Nevis international footballers
Saint Kitts and Nevis football managers
Sportspeople from Burlington, Ontario
Soccer people from Ontario
Canadian soccer players
K-W United FC players
York United FC players
Vaughan Azzurri players
USL League Two players
League1 Ontario players
Canadian Premier League players
Canadian soccer coaches
Canadian people of Saint Kitts and Nevis descent
Sportspeople of Saint Kitts and Nevis descent
Guelph United F.C. players
Guelph Gryphons men's soccer players
Guelph Gryphons men's soccer coaches
Competitors at the 2015 Summer Universiade